Youngnam Theological University and Seminary, also YTUS, is located in Gyeongsan City, North Gyeongsang province, South Korea, in an area inhabited by numerous other institutions of higher learning.  It is officially a university, and is affiliated with the Presbyterian Church of Korea.

History
The Bible school which would become YTUS was founded by James E. Adams, an American missionary, in 1913.  After the end of the Korean War, a formal seminary was established on April 12, 1954.  At that time it was called "Daegu Presbyterian Seminary" and was located in Daegu.  The name changed to Youngnam Seminary in 1970, and the campus changed to its present location in 1987.  In the same year, the seminary was accredited as a four-year college by the South Korean Ministry of Education.   The school was reorganized as a university, and adopted its current lengthy name, in 1994.  Two years later, the graduate school was established.

See also
List of colleges and universities in South Korea
Education in South Korea

External links
Official website 

Universities and colleges in North Gyeongsang Province
Seminaries and theological colleges in South Korea
1913 establishments in Korea
Educational institutions established in 1913